Anne-Lise Wang (March 2, 1920 – March 20, 1967) was a Norwegian actress.

Career
Wang performed at Chat Noir and the Oslo New Theater. She also appeared in seven feature films between 1942 and 1958.

Personal life
Wang was born in Kristiania (now Oslo), Norway. She was the daughter of Fritz Wang (1888–1952) and Hertha Olsen (1891–1959). In 1948 she became the second wife of the theatre director Johan Henrik Wiers-Jenssen. Wang died of heart failure at age 47 in Hammerfest, Norway.

Filmography
1942: Det æ'kke te å tru as Vera
1946: Et spøkelse forelsker seg as Tyttebæret
1947: Sankt Hans fest as Emma Sørensen
1953: Brudebuketten as a model
1954: I moralens navn as Agathe Mowitz, Alf's wife
1957: Fjols til fjells as the model Mona Miller
1958: Bustenskjold as a hotel guest

References

External links
 
 Anne-Lise Wang at Sceneweb

1930 births
1967 deaths
20th-century Norwegian actresses
Actresses from Oslo